"He Loves and She Loves" is a 1927 song composed by George Gershwin, with lyrics written by Ira Gershwin.

It replaced the song "How Long Has This Been Going On?" in the Broadway musical Funny Face. It was introduced by Adele Astaire and Allen Kearns. Fred Astaire sang it in the 1957 film of the same name.

Notable recordings 
Tony Bennett - Steppin' Out (1993)
Petula Clark -  Lost in You (2013).
Ella Fitzgerald - Ella Fitzgerald Sings the George and Ira Gershwin Songbook (1959)
Stacey Kent - Let Yourself Go: Celebrating Fred Astaire (2000)
Sarah Vaughan - Sarah Vaughan Sings George Gershwin (1958)

References

Songs with music by George Gershwin
Songs with lyrics by Ira Gershwin
Fred Astaire songs
Songs from Funny Face (musical)
1927 songs